Pima albiplagiatella, the white-edged pima moth or beach pea borer, is a species of snout moth described by Alpheus Spring Packard in 1874. It is found in the south-western United States, as well as Colorado, Oregon, Washington, Manitoba, New York and Pennsylvania.

The wingspan is about 20 mm. There is one generation per year.

The larvae feed on Astragalus species, including Astragalus allochrous, Astragalus thurberi and Astragalus wootonii, as well as Lathyrus species. Young larvae bore into developing legumes at the base and cover the opening with white silk. They feed on the seeds. If all seeds of a legume are consumed, a larva may move to another.  The larvae have a greenish-white to white body and a pale brownish-yellow head. They reach a length of 13.1–20.5 mm. Pupation takes place under debris on the soil, usually after overwintering in a hibernaculum.

References

Moths described in 1874
Phycitini
Pima (moth)